Michael Smiley (born 1963) is a Northern Irish comedian and actor. He is perhaps best known for his roles in the films Kill List (2011) and The Lobster (2015).

Early life
Smiley was born in 1963 in Belfast and grew up in Holywood with an older brother and sister. He was raised Catholic.

He moved to London with his first wife in 1983. He began doing stand-up in 1993, after accepting a bet at an open-mic night. He had worked as a cycle courier, like his character in Spaced, and as an acid house DJ.

Career
He became well known for his role as Tyres O'Flaherty, the bicycle riding raver, in two episodes of the Channel 4 sitcom Spaced, and for his appearances at the Edinburgh Fringe and the Melbourne Comedy Festival. He played Mac, a former member of the British Army's Parachute Regiment in the 2008 horror film Outpost and as a zombie in Shaun of the Dead.

In 2003, he guest starred in the Doctor Who audio drama Creatures of Beauty. In 2004 he appeared in season 2, episode 4 of Hustle as Max the forger. He also was a small character in episode 2 "The Model" of 15 Storeys High.

He has appeared in all three series of The Maltby Collection on Radio 4 as Des Wainwright, an eccentric security guard who keeps repeating himself and reminding people he was in the SAS. He plays the part of Benny "Deadhead" Silver in the BBC drama series Luther. In 2010, he had a major role in the film Burke & Hare alongside his Spaced co-stars Simon Pegg and Jessica Hynes.

In 2011, he starred in British horror film Kill List. The film received critical acclaim, and earned him the "Best Supporting Actor" Award at the 2011 British Independent Film Awards.

In 2013, he has appeared in an episode of BBC One's Ripper Street as George Lusk, and the critically acclaimed Channel 4 shows Utopia as Detective Reynolds and Black Mirror as Baxter. He also starred in A Field in England as the main antagonist, the alchemist O'Neill. He also played Roddy in Father Figure. In November 2013 he appeared in the third episode of the BBC Two Mitchell and Webb comedy Ambassadors as Mr Jackson. In 2014, he played Micky Murray in BBC Four's The Life of Rock with Brian Pern.

To coincide with the opening stages of the Giro d'Italia in May 2014, Michael Smiley: Something to Ride Home About was a travelog programme for BBC Northern Ireland, directed by George Kane, featuring Smiley cycling around Northern Ireland and meeting local people. A second series was commissioned for 2015.

In 2014 Smiley played Colonel Morgan Blue in the Doctor Who episode "Into the Dalek".

In 2013, Smiley also starred in the Netflix show Black Mirror as Baxter in “White Bear”. He also had a major role in British crime series Luther (TV series) acting as “Deadhead” Benny Silver from 2010 until 2019.

In 2019, Smiley co-starred with Elijah Wood and Martin Donovan in the film Come to Daddy directed by Ant Timpson.

In 2020, he starred in Dead Still, a six-part Irish-Canadian television drama series, alongside Eileen O'Higgins & Kerr Logan. It premiered on May 18, 2020 on Acorn TV and May 15, 2020 Citytv. The series is a co-production between Ireland's Deadpan Pictures and Canada's Shaftesbury Films and is written by John Morton, and directed by Imogen Murphy and Craig David Wallace.

In 2021, Smiley appeared in the lead role in The Toll, a Welsh black comedy film later released in the USA with the title Tollbooth.

Personal life
Smiley has been married twice and has four children: two with his first wife and childhood sweetheart Merilees, and two with his second wife, journalist/broadcaster Miranda Sawyer. He resides near Brockwell Park in Herne Hill, London.

He shared a flat with Simon Pegg and Nick Frost in the 1990s. He is an avid cyclist.

Filmography

Television

Films

Radio

References

External links

Living people
Male television actors from Northern Ireland
Male actors from Belfast
Male actors from London
1963 births
21st-century male actors from Northern Ireland
Male radio actors from Northern Ireland
Male film actors from Northern Ireland
People from Holywood, County Down
20th-century male actors from Northern Ireland